Aquinas Football Club is a Northern Irish, intermediate football club from Belfast playing in Division 1B of the Northern Amateur Football League. Its home ground is Rathmore Grammar School.

The club was formed as a youth team in 1969, taking its name from Aquinas Hall on the Malone Road, which later became the headquarters of the Arts Council of Northern Ireland. The club achieved intermediate status upon promotion to Division 1C of the Amateur League in 2018, consequently qualifying the club to play in the Irish Cup. In 2019, Aquinas FC gained promotion to 1B of Intermediate league by winning division 1C.

Aquinas Football Club has youth team's in IFA and South Belfast Youth leagues, with over 500 members registered with the club. In addition, Aquinas FC is introducing a girls football programme with the aim of building an equally successful ladies section.

Notes

External links  
 Aquinas club website
 nifootball.co.uk - (For fixtures, results and tables of all Northern Ireland amateur football leagues)

Association football clubs in Northern Ireland
Association football clubs established in 1969
Association football clubs in Belfast
Northern Amateur Football League clubs
1969 establishments in Northern Ireland